Chief Edwin Chukwunwike Uzor (JP)  is a billionaire who hails from Delta State. , he is the chairman of the People's Democratic Party (PDP) in Delta State.

References

Living people
Nigerian politicians
Year of birth missing (living people)
Place of birth missing (living people)